The Preamble to the Albanian Constitution is a brief introductory statement of the Constitution's fundamental purposes and guiding principles. It states in general terms the will of the Albanian people to establish a new constitution based on universal values of freedom, respect for human rights, tolerance, coexistence and the determination to build a prosperous society that abides by the laws and regulations henceforth put in place.

Preamble

References

Preambles of Constitutions of Albania